Perfluoroalkyl carboxylic acids (PFCAs), or perfluorocarboxylic acids are compounds of the formula CnF(2n+1)CO2H that belong to the class of per- and polyfluoroalkyl substances. The simplest example is trifluoroacetic acid.  These compounds are organofluorine analogues of ordinary carboxylic acids, but they are stronger by several pKa units and they exhibit great hydrophobic character.  Perfluoroalkyl dicarboxylic acids (PFdiCAs) are also known, e.g. C2F4(CO2H)2.

Applications 
Trifluoroacetic acid is a widely employed acid, used for example in the synthesis of peptides.  Its esters are useful in analytical chemistry.

Longer-chain perfluoroalkyl carboxylic acids, e.g. with five to nine carbons, are useful fluorosurfactants and emulsifiers used in the production of polytetrafluoroethylene (Teflon) and related fluoropolymers.

Production 
These compounds are typically prepared by electrochemical fluorination of the carboxylic acid fluorides followed by hydrolysis:
CnH(2n+1)COF  +  (2n+1) HF   →  CnF(2n+1)COF  +  (2n+1) H2
CnF(2n+1)COF   +  H2O   →   CnF(2n+1)CO2H  +  HF

Environmental concerns 
Long-chain PFCAs such as perfluorooctanoic acid (PFOA) are either banned or being under scrutiny because they are extremely persistent and bioaccumulative. Short-chain PFCAs (scPFCAs) are formed from atmospheric oxidation of fluorotelomer compounds and chlorofluorocarbon (CFC) replacements introduced as a result of the Montreal Protocol.

Side-chain fluorinated polymers (SCFPs), in which fluorotelomers are attached to a polymer backbone, may release fluorotelomer alcohols through hydrolysis. The latter are then degraded to PFCAs.

Common examples

See also 
 Per- and polyfluoroalkyl substances
 Surflon S-111

References

Further reading